Alpestre is the northernmost municipality in the state of Rio Grande do Sul, Brazil. The city lies near the Uruguay River, at its northernmost point. A landmark called Ponto Extremo Norte (Extreme North Point) marks the northernmost point of the state.

References 

Municipalities in Rio Grande do Sul
Populated places established in 1963